Derbyshire County Cricket Club in 1986 was the cricket season when the English club Derbyshire had been playing for one hundred and sixteen years. In the County Championship, they won five matches to finish eleventh in their eighty-second season in the Championship. They came ninth in the John Player League and reached round 2 in the National Westminster Bank Trophy. They reached the quarter-final of the Benson & Hedges Cup.

1986 season

Derbyshire played twenty four matches in the County Championship and one against the touring New Zealanders . They won five first class matches overall all in the championship. They won seven and lost nine matches in the Sunday league. After winning all their matches in Group A, Derbyshire went through to the quarter-final of the Benson & Hedges Cup.
  
Kim Barnett was in his third season as captain. John Morris was top scorer although Kim Barnett scored most runs in the one-day game. Michael Holding took most wickets.

The team set a first-class record partnership for the 10th wicket during the season when Alan Hill and Martin Jean-Jacques made 132 against Yorkshire at Sheffield.

Matches

First Class
{| class="wikitable" width="100%"
! bgcolor="#efefef" colspan=6 | List of matches
|- bgcolor="#efefef"
!No.
!Date
!V
!Result 
!Margin
!Notes
  |- 
|1 
|26 Apr 1986
| Middlesex    Lord's Cricket Ground, St John's Wood 
|bgcolor="#FFCC00"|Drawn
|
|    Radley 103 
 |- 
|2
 |30 Apr 1986  
| SomersetQueen's Park, Chesterfield 
|bgcolor="#FFCC00"|Drawn
|
|    B Roberts 124; PG Newman 5-62 
|- 
|3
 |24 May 1986  
| Nottinghamshire  County Ground, Derby 
|bgcolor="#FFCC00"|Drawn
 | 
|    Rice 120; Hadlee 6-31; Afford 5-71 
|- 
|4
 |31 May 1986  
| Essex   County Ground, Derby  
|bgcolor="#FF0000"|Lost
| 116 runs
|    Border 110; Lever 5-32 
|- 
|5
| 4 Jun 1986
| Yorkshire Abbeydale Park, Sheffield  
|bgcolor="#00FF00"|Won 
| 99 runs
|    A Hill 172; MA Holding 5-28 
|- 
|6
 |7 Jun 1986 
|  Surrey Kennington Oval   
|bgcolor="#FF0000"|Lost
| 9 wickets
|    Clarke 5-43 
|- 
|7
 |14 Jun 1986  
|  Gloucestershire  Wagon Works Ground, Gloucester 
|bgcolor="#FFCC00"|Drawn
|
|    Lloyds 111; DE Malcolm 5-42 
|- 
|8
 |21 Jun 1986 
|  Gloucestershire  Queen's Park, Chesterfield  
|bgcolor="#FFCC00"|Drawn
|
|    Stovold 118; KJ Barnett 114; Walsh 7-62 
|- 
|9
 |28 Jun 1986 
| Lancashire  Aigburth, Liverpool 
|bgcolor="#FFCC00"|Drawn
|
|    JE Morris 153 
|- 
|10
 |2 Jul 1986
|  Worcestershire County Ground, Derby 
|bgcolor="#FFCC00"|Drawn
|
|    Newport 6-49; MA Holding 7-97; Illingworth 5-64
|- 
|11
 |5 Jul 1986   
| Kent  County Ground, Derby
|bgcolor="#00FF00"|Won
| 28 runs
|   JE Morris 191; Alderman 8-46; M Jean-Jacques 8-77; G Miller 5-77 
|- 
|12
 |16 Jul 1986 
| Warwickshire Edgbaston, Birmingham 
|bgcolor="#FFCC00"|Drawn
|
|    G Miller 5-37 
|- 
|13
 |19 Jul 1986  
| Middlesex    County Ground, Derby 
|bgcolor="#00FF00"|Won
| 1 wicket
|    Slack 100; OH Mortensen 5-35  
|- 
|14
 |23 Jul 1986 
| Hampshire United Services Recreation Ground, Portsmouth   
|bgcolor="#FF0000"|Lost
| 5 runs
|    Greenidge 144; MA Holding 5-89; Tremlett 5-46 
|- 
|15
 |26 Jul 1986  
| Glamorgan  Pen-y-Pound, Abergavenny   
|bgcolor="#00FF00"|Won
| 3 wickets
|     
|- 
|16
|  2 Aug 1986
| New Zealand   County Ground, Derby 
|bgcolor="#FFCC00"|Drawn
|
|    Maher 126; Edgar 110 
|- 
|17
 |6 Aug 1986 
|  Sussex   The Saffrons, Eastbourne  
|bgcolor="#FF0000"|Lost
| 3 wickets
|    A Hill 130; PArker 100 
|- 
|18
 |9 Aug 1986
| Lancashire  Park Road Ground, Buxton 
|bgcolor="#FFCC00"|Drawn
|
|     
|- 
|19
 |16 Aug 1986 
| Yorkshire Queen's Park, Chesterfield  
|bgcolor="#FFCC00"|Drawn
|
|    MA Holding 5-46 
|- 
|20
 |20 Aug 1986 
|Leicestershire Queen's Park, Chesterfield  
|bgcolor="#FFCC00"|Drawn
|
|    Whittaker 175; RJ Finney 7-54 
|- 
|21
 |23 Aug 1986
| Nottinghamshire  Trent Bridge, Nottingham 
|bgcolor="#FFCC00"|Drawn
|
|    Hemmings 5-107 
|- 
|22
 |27 Aug 1986
| Leicestershire Grace Road, Leicester 
|bgcolor="#FFCC00"|Drawn
|
|    Willey 168; JE Morris 118; Whittaker 106; DeFreitas 5-92 
|- 
|23
 |30 Aug 1986
| Hampshire County Ground, Derby 
|bgcolor="#FF0000"|Lost
| 9 wickets
|    KJ Barnett 98; Greenidge 103 and 180; A Hill 119 Marshall 5-49 
|- 
|24
 |3 Sep 1986
| Northamptonshire  County Ground, Derby 
|bgcolor="#FFCC00"|Drawn
|
|    Lamb 159; Bailey 114; KJ Barnett 143; JE Morris 127; Capel 7-86 
|- 
|25
 |13 Sep 1986  
| Somerset County Ground, Taunton
|bgcolor="#00FF00"|Won
| 3 wickets
|    (single innings match) 
|-

John Player League 
{| class="wikitable" width="70%"
! bgcolor="#efefef" colspan=6 | List of matches
|- bgcolor="#efefef"
!No.
!Date
!V
!Result 
!Margin
!Notes
  |- 
|1
|4 May 1986  
| Leicestershire Grace Road, Leicester 
|bgcolor="#FF0000"|Lost
| 19 runs
|    Potter 105 
 |- 
|- 
|2
 |11 May 1986  
|  Sussex   County Ground, Derby 
|bgcolor="#00FF00"|Won
| 8 wickets
|     
|- 
|3
| 18 May 1986  
| Warwickshire Highfield, Leek
|bgcolor="#FF0000"|Lost
| 5 wickets
 |     
|- 
|4
| 1 Jun 1986  
 | Essex   County Ground, Derby 
|bgcolor="#FF0000"|Lost
| 8 wickets
|    Foster 5-17 
|- 
|5
 |8 Jun 1986  
 |  Surrey Kennington Oval  
|bgcolor="#00FF00"|Won
| 3 wickets
|     
 |- 
|6
 |15 Jun 1986   
|  Gloucestershire  Wagon Works Ground, Gloucester 
|bgcolor="#00FF00"|Won
| 5 wickets
 |     
|- 
|7
| 6 Jul 1986  
| Kent  County Ground, Derby 
|bgcolor="#FF0000"|Lost
| 11 runs
|     
|- 
|8
 |13 Jul 1986
| Northamptonshire  Dolben Cricket Ground, Finedon 
|bgcolor="#FF0000"|Lost
| 97 runs
 |    Wild 5-7 
|- 
|9
| 20 Jul 1986
| Middlesex    County Ground, Derby 
|bgcolor="#00FF00"|Won
| 7 wickets
|     
|- 
|10
| 27 Jul 1986
 | Glamorgan   Eugene Cross Park, Ebbw Vale 
|bgcolor="#FF0000"|Lost
| 4 runs
|    H Morris 100 
|- 
|11
 |10 Aug 1986
 | Lancashire  Park Road Ground, Buxton  
|bgcolor="#00FF00"|Won
| 3 wickets
|     
 |- 
|12
 |17 Aug 1986
 | Yorkshire Queen's Park, Chesterfield  
|bgcolor="#00FF00"|Won
| 10 wickets
|     
 |- 
|13
 |24 Aug 1986   
| Nottinghamshire  Trent Bridge, Nottingham 
|bgcolor="#FF0000"|Lost
| 23 runs
|    Broad 104 
|- 
|14
 |31 Aug 1986
| Hampshire Town Ground, Heanor  
|bgcolor="#FF0000"|Lost
| 73 runs
 |     
|- 
|15
 |7 Sep 1986
|  Worcestershire County Ground, New Road, Worcester 
|bgcolor="#00FF00"|Won
| 1 wicket
 |     
|- 
|16
| 14 Sep 1986  
| SomersetCounty Ground, Taunton 
|bgcolor="#FF0000"|Lost
| 3 wickets
|     
 |-

|

National Westminster Bank Trophy 
{| class="wikitable" width="70%"
! bgcolor="#efefef" colspan=6 | List of matches
|- bgcolor="#efefef"
!No.
!Date
!V
!Result 
!Margin
!Notes
 |- 
|1st Round
| 25 Jun 1986
 | CornwallCounty Ground, Derby 
|bgcolor="#00FF00"|Won
| 204 runs
|    S Anderson 134; A Hill 153 
|- 
|2nd Round
| 9 Jul 1986
 |  SurreyCounty Ground, Derby 
|bgcolor="#FF0000"|Lost
| 62 runs
|     
 |-

Benson and Hedges Cup
 {| class="wikitable" width="60%"
! bgcolor="#efefef" colspan=6 | List of matches
|- bgcolor="#efefef"
!No.
!Date
!V
!Result 
!Margin
!Notes
|-
| Group A 1
 |3 May 1986
|Leicestershire Queen's Park, Chesterfield  
 |bgcolor="#00FF00"|Won
| Faster rate
|     
 |- 
| Group A 2
 |10 May 1986
 | Northamptonshire  County Ground, Northampton 
|bgcolor="#00FF00"|Won
| 38 runs
|     
 |- 
| Group A 3
 |15 May 1986
|  Minor Counties cricket team  County Ground, Derby 
|bgcolor="#00FF00"|Won
| 7 wickets
|     
 |- 
| Group A 4
 |17 May 1986
| Warwickshire  Edgbaston, Birmingham 
|bgcolor="#00FF00"|Won
| 3 wickets
|     
 |- 
| Quarter Final
 |28 May 1986
| Kent  County Ground, Derby 
|bgcolor="#FF0000"|Lost
| 4 wickets
|     
 |-

Statistics

Competition batting averages

Competition bowling averages

Wicket Keeping
Chris Marples
County Championship Catches 30, Stumping 3
John Player League Catches 1, Stumping 0

Bruce Roberts
County Championship Catches 12, Stumping 1
National Westminster Trophy Catches 2, Stumping 0
Benson and Hedges Cup Catches 1, Stumping 1

See also
Derbyshire County Cricket Club seasons
1986 English cricket season

References

1986 in English cricket
Derbyshire County Cricket Club seasons